Oxycnemis is a genus of moths of the family Noctuidae. The genus was erected by Augustus Radcliffe Grote in 1882.

Species
 Oxycnemis acuna Barnes, 1907
 Oxycnemis advena Grote, 1882
 Oxycnemis franclemonti Blanchard, 1968
 Oxycnemis fusimacula J.B. Smith, 1902
 Oxycnemis gracillinea (Grote, 1881)
 Oxycnemis grandimacula Barnes & McDunnough, 1910 (=Oxycnemis erratica Barnes & McDunnough, 1913)
 Oxycnemis gustis Smith, 1907
 Oxycnemis orbicularis Barnes & McDunnough, 1912

Former species
 Oxycnemis subsimplex Dyar, 1904 is now Sympistis subsimplex (Dyar, 1904)

References

Troubridge, J. T. (2008). "A generic realignment of the Oncocnemidini sensu Hodges (1983) (Lepidoptera: Noctuidae: Oncocnemidinae), with description of a new genus and 50 new species". Zootaxa. 1903: 1–95.

Cuculliinae